Magnesium-chelatase is a three-component enzyme that catalyses the insertion of Mg2+ into protoporphyrin IX. This is the first unique step in the synthesis of chlorophyll and bacteriochlorophyll. As a result, it is thought that Mg-chelatase has an important role in channeling intermediates into the (bacterio)chlorophyll branch in response to conditions suitable for photosynthetic growth:

protoporphyrin IX +  + ATP +   ADP + phosphate + Mg-protoporphyrin IX + 2 

The four substrates of this enzyme are ATP, protoporphyrin IX, Mg2+, and H2O; its four products are ADP, phosphate, Mg-protoporphyrin IX, and H+.

This enzyme belongs to the family of ligases, specifically those forming nitrogen-D-metal bonds in coordination complexes.  The systematic name of this enzyme class is Mg-protoporphyrin IX magnesium-lyase. Other names in common use include protoporphyrin IX magnesium-chelatase, protoporphyrin IX Mg-chelatase, magnesium-protoporphyrin IX chelatase, magnesium-protoporphyrin chelatase, magnesium-chelatase, Mg-chelatase, and Mg-protoporphyrin IX magnesio-lyase. This enzyme is part of the biosynthetic pathway to chlorophylls.

See also
 Biosynthesis of chlorophylls

References

 
 
 

EC 6.6.1
Enzymes of unknown structure